The Via Mizner is a historic site in Palm Beach, Florida. It is located at 337–339 Worth Avenue. On April 1, 1993, it was added to the U.S. National Register of Historic Places.

A “via” is derived from the Latin word meaning “way” or “path” and is defined by the World English Dictionary as a “way, road, channel, course of uncertain origin.”

The Via was created by the eccentric, visionary architect, Addison Mizner in 1923 after he had completed the Everglades Club (1918), his first major project in Palm Beach, Florida. Via Mizner is located across Worth Avenue from the-still exclusive club. Caroline Seebohm, author of Boca Rococo, How Addison Mizner Invented Florida's Gold Coast, explains a via as follows: "Medieval Spanish castles had contained within their fortified walls what might be called  'inner cities,' where the soldiers and castle employees lived and worked. These walled urban areas were later transformed into commercial spaces." Addison Mizner added: "They (the commercial spaces) usually faced on small winding streets and were entirely open to the people who traversed the narrow pathways."

It was in this spirit that Mizner set out to create Via Mizner. The result is a European-type, pedestrian village with complex, charming and irregular buildings that house shops, offices and residences. Via Mizner (and adjacent Via Parigi) is an interesting combination of Mediterranean Revival and Spanish Colonial Revival architecture mixed with a touch of old Venice, adapted to South Florida's tropical climate. The roofs are terracotta barrel tiles while the white stucco walls are punctuated with numerous, irregular shaped windows, wooden balconies, pecky-cypress accents and balustrades, many with decorative ironwork details. The staircases leading up to the residential units have risers made of colorful ceramic tiles while occasional palm trees reminds us of the tropical setting.

In a pre-mall era, Via Mizner became a unique experience in America, where one could get fresh air while walking and shopping in small stores and galleries that were welcoming in a non-commercial atmosphere.

Via Mizner's combination of architectural styles and decorative detail quickly became Palm Beach's signature look. As the decades passed, countless architects, city planners and designers have copied Mizner's unique design, which can be identified throughout Florida today.

Via Mizner houses twenty well-known shops and businesses as well as a small number of residential apartments. The most famed address is 1, Via Mizner, the architect's own majestic, five-story, tower-like residence called Villa Mizner. The history of this residence is chronicled in Richard René Silvin's book Villa Mizner: The House that Changed Palm Beach (2014). The architect designed the top floor as a single room, which he used as his office. Sixteen windows span the four sides of his office-floor and overlook the entire island of Palm Beach. Mizner's pet monkey, Johnny Brown, is buried at the foot of the home's 35-by-40 foot living room.

Via Mizner remains today exactly as Addison Mizner envisioned it to be.

References

External links

 Palm Beach County listings at National Register of Historic Places
 Florida's Office of Cultural and Historical Programs
 Palm Beach County listings
 Via Mizner

National Register of Historic Places in Palm Beach County, Florida
Palm Beach, Florida
Streets in Florida
Buildings and structures in Palm Beach County, Florida
Addison Mizner buildings
Buildings and structures completed in 1923
1923 establishments in Florida